The Sacred Heart Hospital is a state-run nursing home in Ireland, located just outside Roscommon town.

History
The hospital has its origins in the Roscommon Union Workhouse and Infirmary which was designed by George Wilkinson and opened in 1842. It was later converted for use as a tuberculosis sanatorium and as a psychiatric hospital, and eventually used for rehabilitative services and care of the elderly.

References

Hospital buildings completed in 1842
1842 establishments in Ireland
Hospitals established in 1842
Hospitals in County Roscommon
Health Service Executive hospitals
Tuberculosis sanatoria in Ireland
Roscommon (town)